Tim Heubach (born 12 May 1988) is a German former professional footballer who  played as a centre-back.

Career
On 15 July 2014, it was announced that Heubach would join 1. FC Kaiserslautern on an immediate transfer. Since he still had a contract at FSV Frankfurt until 2015, Kaiserslautern had to pay a reported transfer fee of €400,000. He signed for Kaiserslautern until 2017. In June 2017, at the end of his contract, Heubach left the club.

Heubach announced his retirement from playing in January 2022.

Career statistics

References

External links

1988 births
Living people
German footballers
Association football central defenders
2. Bundesliga players
Regionalliga players
Israeli Premier League players
Malaysia Super League players
Borussia Mönchengladbach players
Borussia Mönchengladbach II players
FSV Frankfurt players
1. FC Kaiserslautern players
1. FC Kaiserslautern II players
Maccabi Netanya F.C. players
German expatriate footballers
German expatriate sportspeople in Israel
Expatriate footballers in Israel
German expatriate sportspeople in Malaysia
Expatriate footballers in Malaysia
Sportspeople from Neuss
Footballers from North Rhine-Westphalia
21st-century German people